was a Japanese illustrator for children's books, born in Okazaki, Aichi. 

He won the first grand prize in Biennial of Illustration Bratislava in 1967 for  written by Masako Matsuno. 

Segawa died on 18 October 2010 of rectal cancer at a hospital in Obuse, Nagano.

Works

 , text by Masako Matsuno
"Peek-a-Boo" (いないないばあ), "Smily Face"（いいおかお）, "Sleepy Time"（みんなねんね） (R.I.C. Story Chest) RIC Publications; Har/Com版 2006, text by Miyoko Matsutani. Translation by Mia Lynn Perry

References

External links
 Yasuo Segawa at J'Lit Books from Japan

Japanese illustrators
2010 deaths
1932 births
People from Okazaki, Aichi